Admiral Sir Edwyn Sinclair Alexander-Sinclair,  (born Alexander; 12 December 1865 – 13 November 1945) was a Scottish Royal Navy officer, notable for firing the first shots of the Battle of Jutland, and for leading a squadron of light cruisers in the Baltic to support independence of Estonia and Latvia in 1918 to 1919.

Early life and education
Sinclair Alexander-Sinclair was born in Malta, the second son of Captain John Hobhouse Inglis Alexander of the Royal Navy, who served as aide-de-camp to Queen Victoria, and Isabella Barbara Hume, daughter of Thomas Cochrane Hume. He succeeded his elder brother in the Southbar property in 1892 and two years later adopted the additional name of Sinclair on succeeding to the estate of Freswick in Caithness.

His paternal grandparents were Boyd Alexander, Lord of Southbar and Ballochmyle, and Sophia Elizabeth Hobhouse, daughter of Sir Benjamin Hobhouse, 1st Baronet and sister of John Hobhouse, 1st Baron Broughton. His father's elder brother was politician Sir Claud Alexander, 1st Baronet.

He succeeded his elder brother in the Southbar property in 1892 and two years later adopted the additional name of Sinclair on succeeding to the estate of Freswick in Caithness.

Naval career
Alexander-Sinclair entered the Royal Navy as cadet in 1879 at the age of 14, becoming a midshipman 2½ years later. Edwyn Sinclair Alexander-Sinclair was first educated at Twyford School He was made lieutenant in 1890, and served as flag-lieutenant to both Admiral Tracey and Admiral Sir Michael Culme-Seymour, gaining promotion to commander in January 1901. He then had two sea commands, the destroyer  from February 1902 serving at the Mediterranean Station from May that year; and after paying her off in January 1904, the despatch vessel  until 1905.

Alexander-Sinclair was promoted to captain in 1905, and was appointed commander of the Royal Naval College, Osborne, serving there until 1908, when he was appointed a Member of the Royal Victorian Order. Between May 1911 and August 1913 he was captain of HMS Victory, the flagship of the Commander-in-Chief, Portsmouth.

He was appointed a Companion of the Order of the Bath for his part in the destruction of Zeppelin L 7 on 4 May 1916. On 31 May 1916 it was the 1st Light Cruiser Squadron under Alexander-Sinclair that first engaged scouting vessels of the German High Seas Fleet and signalled "enemy in sight", leading to the Battle of Jutland, after which he received a mention in dispatches from Vice Admiral Sir David Beatty, commander of the Battlecruiser Fleet, and the Russian Order of St. Vladimir, Third Class with Swords. In November 1918 Alexander-Sinclair was given the honour of leading the surrendered German Fleet into internment at Scapa Flow, and appointed a Knight Commander of the Order of the Bath.

Soon afterwards, in December 1918, Alexander-Sinclair's 6th Squadron was sent to the Baltic, at the request of Estonian Government, to take part in the Estonian War of Independence. They delivered 6,500 rifles, 200 machine guns and two field guns. The British squadron also captured two Russian destroyers, Spartak and Avtroil, and turned them over to Estonia, which renamed them Vambola and Lennuk. Alexander-Sinclair then blockaded the Russian Navy base at Kronstadt until relieved by the 1st Light Cruiser Squadron under Rear-Admiral Walter Cowan. He was Admiral-Superintendent of Portsmouth Dockyard from 1920 to 1922, and after promotion to vice admiral on 4 April 1922, commanded the 1st Battle Squadron, Atlantic Fleet from 1922 to 1924. He then served as Commander-in-Chief, China Station from 1925 to 1926, and after promotion to admiral on 4 October 1926, was Commander-in-Chief, The Nore from 1927 to 1930. He retired in 1930.

See also
 Estonian War of Independence
 Englannin laivastotoimet Itämerllä 1918 – 1921 
 His statue (bust) in Estonian Military Cemetery (opened 12.12.2015) (photos)

References

External links
 The Dreadnought Project – Edwyn Sinclair Alexander-Sinclair

|-

|-

1865 births
1945 deaths
Captains and Commandants of the Royal Naval College, Osborne
People of the Estonian War of Independence
Royal Navy admirals of World War I
Knights Grand Cross of the Order of the Bath
Members of the Royal Victorian Order
Recipients of the Order of St. Vladimir, 3rd class
People from Caithness
Royal Navy personnel of the Russian Civil War